The 2015 Dubai 24 Hour was the 10th running of the Dubai 24 Hour. The event was held from January 8 to January 10, 2015 at the Dubai Autodrome, United Arab Emirates.

Result

References

Dubai 24 Hour
Dubai 24 Hour
Dubai 24 Hour
Dubai 24 Hour